Randy Fontanez (born May 18, 1989) is an American former professional baseball pitcher who played internationally for the Puerto Rican national baseball team.

Career
Fontanez attended Oviedo High School in Oviedo, Florida, and the University of South Florida, where he played college baseball for the South Florida Bulls baseball team. In 2010, he played collegiate summer baseball with the Yarmouth–Dennis Red Sox of the Cape Cod Baseball League. The New York Mets selected Fontanez in the 27th round of the 2011 Major League Baseball draft.

Fontanez pitched for the Puerto Rican national baseball team in the 2013 World Baseball Classic. At the 2014 Winter Meetings, the Los Angeles Dodgers selected Fontanez in the Class AAA phase of the Rule 5 draft. He appeared in 23 games across three minor league levels for the Dodgers organization in 2015 and was 3–7 with a 5.37 ERA (making 11 starts). He was released by the Dodgers in January 2016.

References

External links

1989 births
Living people
Baseball players from Florida
Baseball pitchers
2013 World Baseball Classic players
South Florida Bulls baseball players
Sportspeople from Seminole County, Florida
Yarmouth–Dennis Red Sox players
Brooklyn Cyclones players
St. Lucie Mets players
Indios de Mayagüez players
Savannah Sand Gnats players
Binghamton Mets players
People from Oviedo, Florida
Rancho Cucamonga Quakes players
Oklahoma City Dodgers players
Tulsa Drillers players